Dahoga is an unincorporated community in Jones Township in Elk County, Pennsylvania, United States. Dahoga is located along Pennsylvania Route 321, northwest of Wilcox.

References

Unincorporated communities in Elk County, Pennsylvania
Unincorporated communities in Pennsylvania